"Darlin' Darlin' Baby (Sweet, Tender, Love)" was a hit song by R&B vocal trio The O'Jays released in late 1976 and written and produced by Kenny Gamble & Leon Huff.

Released as the follow-up single to "Message in Our Music", it was their second number-one R&B single from the album Message in the Music, and was less successful on the Billboard Hot 100 than the trio's previous release, peaking at number 72.

Chart positions

Samples
In 1997, Bronx born rapper Big Pun sampled "Darlin' Darlin' Baby" for the first version of his breakout hit "I'm Not a Player." The O'Jays make a cameo in the music video.

References

1976 singles
The O'Jays songs
Songs written by Leon Huff
Songs written by Kenny Gamble
1976 songs
Philadelphia International Records singles